Monti la Spina – Zaccana is a mountain range of Basilicata, southern Italy.

Mountains of Basilicata